Muscicapida is a clade of birds in the order Passeriformes. Oliveros, C.H. et al. (2019) suggested a gondwanan migration of this lineage from Australia to Eurasia.

Systematics
The parvorder contains the following 19 families:

 Bombycilloidea
 Dulidae: palmchat
 Bombycillidae: waxwings
 Ptiliogonatidae: silky flycatchers
 Hylocitreidae: hylocitrea
 Hypocoliidae: hypocolius
† Mohoidae: oos
 Muscicapoidea
 Elachuridae: spotted elachura
 Cinclidae: dippers
 Muscicapidae: Old World flycatchers and chats
 Turdidae: thrushes and allies
 Buphagidae: oxpeckers
 Sturnidae: starlings and rhabdornis
 Mimidae: mockingbirds and thrashers
 Regulidae: goldcrests and kinglets
 Certhioidea
 Tichodromidae: wallcreeper
 Sittidae: nuthatches
 Certhiidae: treecreepers
 Polioptilidae: gnatcatchers
 Troglodytidae: wrens

The cladogram of Muscicapida shown below is based on the analysis of Carl Oliveros and colleagues published in 2019:

References

Passerida